Ludovico Edalli (born 18 December 1993) is an Italian male artistic gymnast and a member of the national team. He competed at the 2016 Summer Olympics, and 2020 Summer Olympics.

Career 
He participated in two editions of the World Championships (2014 in Nanjing, China, and 2015 in Glasgow, Scotland), and qualified for the 2016 Summer Olympics, securing one of the spots available at the Olympic Test Event in Rio de Janeiro.

References

External links 
 
 Ludovico EDALLI at the Italian Olympic Committee (CONI)

1993 births
Living people
Italian male artistic gymnasts
People from Busto Arsizio
Gymnasts at the 2010 Summer Youth Olympics
Gymnasts at the 2016 Summer Olympics
Olympic gymnasts of Italy
Mediterranean Games silver medalists for Italy
Mediterranean Games medalists in gymnastics
Competitors at the 2013 Mediterranean Games
Gymnasts at the 2020 Summer Olympics
Sportspeople from the Province of Varese
Gymnasts at the 2022 Mediterranean Games
21st-century Italian people